The United Arab Emirates national beach soccer team represents United Arab Emirates in beach soccer. They are one of the most successful Asian national teams, having won twice the AFC Beach Soccer Asian Cup (2007, 2008). At the FIFA Beach Soccer World Cup, however, they have never got past the Group Stage. The UAE team has participated in every edition of the Beach Soccer Intercontinental Cup, which was founded after the 2009 FIFA Beach Soccer World Cup was hosted in the United Arab Emirates and which is played only in the UAE,They will host it once again as for the second time in 2023.

Roster
The following players and staff members were called up for the 2021 FIFA Beach Soccer World Cup.

Head coach:  Mohamed Abbas Mohamed Bashir Almaazmi
Assistant coach:  Victor Barros da Silva Vasques
Goalkeeping coach:  Mohamed Hamza Ali Hussain Almazami

Results and fixtures

2022

2023

Competitive record

FIFA Beach Soccer World Cup

AFC Beach Soccer Asian Cup

Beach Soccer Intercontinental Cup

Reference

External links
United Arab Emirates at FIFA
United Arab Emirates at BSWW
 United Arab Emirates at Beach Soccer Russia

National sports teams of the United Arab Emirates
Football in the United Arab Emirates
Asian national beach soccer teams